"Hangin' Tough" is a song by American boy band New Kids on the Block, released as a single in 1989 through Columbia Records. It was the fourth single from the group's second album of the same name (1988). The lead vocals are sung by Donnie Wahlberg.

"Hangin' Tough" peaked at  1 on the US Billboard Hot 100 chart on September 9, 1989, and topped the UK Singles Chart, where it became the first new No. 1 single of the 1990s yet the lowest-selling No. 1 hit up to that point. It is their only No. 1 single in Ireland and reached the top 10 in Australia, Canada, and New Zealand.

Background
There are two distinct renditions of the song: the original album version, which includes a keyboard solo; and the remixed version, which is arguably more recognizable and is commonly included on Greatest Hits albums. The remixed version features a guitar solo and heavier instrumentation.

"Hanging Tough" was used in the 1989 film The Wizard as well as on the Regular Show episode "High Score." In 1991 it was used as the entrance theme for the tag team of Tony Williams and Brian Lawler in the Memphis, Tennessee-based United States Wrestling Association. Alvin and the Chipmunks released a cover version in 1991 for their album The Chipmunks Rock the House.

It appeared in It and SingStar Dance.

Track listings
US, UK, and Dutch 7-inch vinyl
A. "Hangin' Tough" (7-inch remix) – 3:54
B. "Didn't I (Blow Your Mind)" – 4:24

UK 12-inch vinyl
A1. "Hangin' Tough" (Tougher Mix) – 3:32
B1. "Hangin' Tough" (LP version) – 4:16
B2. "Didn't I (Blow Your Mind)" – 4:24

UK maxi-CD
 "Hangin' Tough" (7-inch remix) – 3:54
 "Hangin' Tough" (Tougher Mix) – 3:32
 "Didn't I (Blow Your Mind)" – 4:24

UK 12-inch vinyl
A1. "Hangin' Tough" (Tougher Mix) – 3:32
A2. "What'cha Gonna Do (About It)" – 3:54
B1. "Hangin' Tough" (LP version) – 4:16
B2. "Didn't I (Blow Your Mind)" – 4:24

Charts

Weekly charts

Year-end charts

Certifications and sales

References

External links
 Joey McIntyre discusses "Hangin' Tough" - RetroRewind interview
 Official video

1989 singles
Billboard Hot 100 number-one singles
Columbia Records singles
New Kids on the Block songs
Song recordings produced by Maurice Starr
Songs written by Maurice Starr
UK Singles Chart number-one singles